Trichopetalidae is a family of millipedes in the order Chordeumatida. Adult millipedes in this family have 28 or 30 segments (counting the collum as the first segment and the telson as the last). There are about 5 genera and at least 30 described species in Trichopetalidae.

Genera
 Causeyella
 Mexiterpes Causey, 1963
 Scoterpes Cope, 1872
 Trichopetalum Harger, 1872
 Trigenotyla Causey, 1951

References

Further reading

 
 
 
 

Chordeumatida
Millipede families